Prof. Dr. Muse Mary George (born 12 March 1965) is a Malayalam writer, literary  critic, and educationist. She published more than 50 articles and poems in magazines. She worked as a columnist. Muse worked as a professor in the Department of Malayalam at Union Christian College, Aluva. Muse Mary's collections of poems include "Ispadu Rani" and "Rahasyandriyangal".  She works as director of State Institute of Encyclopaedic Publications

Books
 Streepaksha Madhyama Padanangal (Ed) - Current books, Kottayam
 Ispedu Rani (Collection of Poems) -Grey Friars Publications
 Malayalam Intercom - DC Books, Kottayam 
 Rahasya Indriyangal (Collection of Poems)- Fabian books
 Streeye Enikkum Ninakkum Enthu? -Christava Sahithya Samithy
 Utaladhikaram - Olive Publications
 Mercury Jeevithathinte Resamapini -Sahithya Pravarthak co-operative Society 
 Disgrace (Translation) - DC Books 
 Pazhaya Kruthi Puthiya Vayana - Study Ancient Malayalam Books, Published by dept of Malayalam 
 Gender / Linga Padhavi - Published by Dept of Malayalam
 Uppu Tharisse - (Collection of Poems) Published by DC Books, Kottayam
 Mary’s Musings - (Essays) Published by Saikatham Books, Kothamangalam

Recognition
 1993-Assissi Literary Award 
 2012- Mahilathilakam Award by Social Welfare Dept Govt of Kerala
 2015- M.P.Paul Research Award for supervising the best dissertation
 2018- Sahodharan Ayyappan Award

References

External links 
മനോരമ ബുക്സ് കവിത മഴയിൽ മ്യൂസ് മേരി ജോർജ്...മനോരമ ബുക്സ് കവിത മഴയിൽ മ്യൂസ് മേരി ജോർജ്
എന്നു നിങ്ങളുടെ മ്യൂസ് മേരി..എന്നു നിങ്ങളുടെ മ്യൂസ് മേരി
 DGP Jacob Thomas leads front against graft
 വാക്കു മുറിയാതേം, നടു കുനിയാതേം വന്നുനിന്ന് വര്‍ത്തമാനം പറയുന്ന കവിതകള്‍..വാക്കു മുറിയാതേം, നടു കുനിയാതേം വന്നുനിന്ന് വര്‍ത്തമാനം പറയുന്ന കവിതകള്‍

Living people
1965 births
Malayalam-language writers
Writers from Kerala
Malayalam literary critics
20th-century Indian women writers
20th-century Indian writers
21st-century Indian women writers
21st-century Indian writers
People from Kottayam district
Women writers from Kerala
Women educators from Kerala
Educators from Kerala
21st-century women educators